Lothar Müthel (né Lothar Max Lütcke; 18 February 1896 – 4 September 1964) was a German stage and film actor and director.

Career

Müthel was born in Berlin, where he attended the acting school of Max Reinhardt, Schauspielschule, Berlin. Following the Anchluss of Austria to Nazi Germany, Müthel was appointed as director of the Burgtheater in Vienna. He held that position from 1939 until the fall of the Nazi regime in 1945. Under his directorship in 1943, a notoriously extreme production of The Merchant of Venice was staged at the Burgtheater, with Werner Krauss as Shylock.

Death
Müthel died in Frankfurt am Main at age 68.

Selected filmography
 The Galley Slave (1919)
 The Golem: How He Came into the World (1920) as Knight Florian
The Woman in Heaven (1920) as Feodor
 The Mayor of Zalamea (1920) as Juan
 The Night of Queen Isabeau (1920) as Jehan
Destiny (1921) as the messenger
 The False Dimitri (1922) as the Polish envoy
 Lucrezia Borgia (1922) as Juan Borgia
 Goetz von Berlichingen of the Iron Hand (1925) as Brother Martin
Faust (1956) as the monk
 Yorck (1931) as General von Clausewitz

References
Lothar Müthel biography, cyranos.ch. Retrieved 25 January 2018. 

1896 births
1964 deaths
German male stage actors
German male film actors
German male silent film actors
German theatre directors
Opera managers
Sturmabteilung personnel
20th-century German male actors